The Lambton Worm is a legend from County Durham in North-East England in the United Kingdom. The story takes place around the River Wear, and is one of the area's most famous pieces of folklore, having been adapted from written and oral tradition into pantomime and song formats.

The legend 
The story revolves around John Lambton, an heir of the Lambton Estate, County Durham (now in Tyne and Wear), and his battle with a giant worm (dragon) that had been terrorising the local villages.

Origin of the worm 
The story states that the young John Lambton was a rebellious character who missed church one Sunday to go fishing in the River Wear. In many versions of the story, while walking to the river, or setting up his equipment, John receives warnings from an old man (or a witch – depending on who tells the story) that no good can come from missing church.

John Lambton does not catch anything until the church service finishes, at which point he fishes out a small eel- or lamprey-like creature with nine holes on each side of its salamander-like head. In some renditions it has legs, while in others it is said to more closely resemble a snake.

At this point, the old man returns, although in some versions it is a different character. John declares that he has "catched [caught] the devil" and decides to dispose of his catch by discarding it down a nearby well. The old man then issues further warnings about the nature of the beast.

John then forgets about the creature and eventually grows up. As a penance for his rebellious early years, he joins the Crusades. Because the story is often said to have taken place in the 14th century, he likely fought in the Barbary Crusade or Lithuanian Crusade.

The worm's wrath 

Eventually, the worm grows extremely large and the well becomes poisonous. The villagers start to notice livestock going missing and discover that the fully-grown worm has emerged from the well and coiled itself around a local hill.

Earlier, and local, versions of the legend associate the hill with Worm Hill, in Fatfield. In  most versions of the story, the worm is large enough to wrap itself around the hill seven times. It is said that one can still see the marks of the worm on Worm Hill.  However, in the later song the hill is Penshaw Hill on which the Penshaw Monument now stands.

The worm terrorises the nearby villages, eating sheep, preventing cows from producing milk, and snatching away small children. It then heads towards Lambton Castle, where the Lord (John Lambton's aged father) manages to sedate the creature in what becomes a daily ritual of offering the worm the milk of nine good cows – twenty gallons, or a filled trough.

A number of brave villagers try to kill the beast, but are quickly dispatched. When a chunk is cut off the worm, it simply reattaches the missing piece. Visiting knights also try to assault the beast, but none survive. When annoyed, the worm uproots trees by coiling its tail around them, then creates devastation by waving around the uprooted trees like a club.

The vanquishing of the worm in the story
After seven years, John Lambton returns from the Crusades to find his father's estates almost destitute because of the worm. John decides to fight it, but first seeks the guidance of a wise woman or witch near Durham.

The witch hardens John's resolve to kill the beast by explaining his responsibility for the worm. She tells him to cover his armour in spearheads and fight the worm in the River Wear, where it now spends its days wrapped around a great rock. The witch also tells John that after killing the worm he must then kill the first living thing he sees, or else his family will be cursed for nine generations and will not die in their beds.

John prepares his armour according to the witch's instructions and arranges with his father that, when he has killed the worm, he will sound his hunting horn three times. On this signal, his father is to release his favourite hound so that it will run to John, who can then kill the dog and thus avoid the curse.

John Lambton then fights the worm by the river. The worm tries to crush him, wrapping him in its coils, but it cuts itself on his armour's spikes; the pieces of the worm fall into the river, and are washed away before they can join up again. Eventually, the worm is dead and John sounds his hunting horn three times.

The Lambton curse 
Unfortunately, John's father is so excited that the beast is dead that he forgets to release the hound and rushes out to congratulate his son. John cannot bear to kill his father and so, after they meet, the hound is released and dutifully dispatched. But it is too late and nine generations of Lambtons are cursed so they shall not die peacefully in their beds. Thus, the story ends.

This curse seems to have held true for at least three generations, possibly helping to contribute to the popularity of the story.
 1st generation: Robert Lambton, drowned at Newrig.
 2nd: Sir William Lambton, a Colonel of Foot, killed at Marston Moor.
 3rd: William Lambton, died in battle at Wakefield.
 9th: Henry Lambton, died in his carriage crossing Lambton Bridge on 26 June 1761.

(General Lambton, Henry Lambton's brother, is said to have kept a horse whip by his bedside to ward off violent assaults. He died in his bed at an old age.)

Cultural impact

Song 

The story was made into a song (Roud #2337), written in 1867 by C. M. Leumane, which passed into oral tradition and has several slightly different variants (most notably the use of "goggly" or "googly" eyes meaning bulging and searching, a term formerly widely used on Wearside). It features several words only found in Northumbrian dialect.

Tune from Tyne Pantomime 1867

Comics and literature 

 Bram Stoker's 1911 novel The Lair of the White Worm and Ian Watson's 1988 novel The Fire Worm draw heavily on the Lambton Worm legend.
 This myth, along with many others originating from the North East, is retold in the graphic novel Alice in Sunderland by Bryan Talbot.
 Jeff Smith's graphic novel Rose has the title character following the same instructions to order to defeat a dragon.
 The Lambton Worm legend, including the subsequent death of Henry Lambton, is referred to in Thomas Pynchon's novel Mason and Dixon; typically, given the themes of mythology and historiography within the novel, Pynchon alters some details of the legend (for instance, moving to Transylvania the location of the "wise woman" who gives advice given to John Lambton on how to defeat the worm).
 A version of the tale was published by Joseph Jacobs, using William Henderson's text in Folk-Lore of Northern Counties as a source.
 "Jabberwocky" may have been partly inspired by the legend of the Lambton Worm.
 Willam Mayne's children's novel The Worm in the Well, published in 2002, is an adapted retelling of the Lambton Worm legend.
 Sarah Hindmarsh's "The Worm," a short story published in The Forgotten and the Fantastical 2, edited by Teika Bellamy, is based on the Lambton Worm story. 
 The modern fantasy novel The Green Man's Heir (2018) by Juliet E. McKenna features a surviving juvenile specimen and the urgent need to counter the threat it presents.
 In 2018, Mike Mignola & Ben Steinbeck produced a short comic titled "Return of the Lambton Worm," which features a confrontation between the monster and Hellboy.

Opera 
The Lambton Worm (1978) is an opera in two acts by the composer Robert Sherlaw Johnson with a libretto by the Oxford poet Anne Ridler. There are eleven solo roles (four of them major), a chorus and orchestra.

Film 

 The 1988 film The Lair of the White Worm is based on Stoker's novel. Leumane's song is recast in the film as the "d'Ampton Worm", arranged by Emilio Perez Machado and Stephan Powys, and performed by them and Louise Newman.
 In 1989, screenwriter Anthony Shaffer wrote a film treatment for The Loathsome Lambton Worm, a direct sequel to his 1973 film The Wicker Man. The sequel would have involved the original film's protagonist, a Scottish police officer, battling the Lambton Worm. However, it was never officially produced.
 A fan-made full-cast audio drama adaptation of Shaffer's The Loathsome Lambton Worm treatment was eventually released in 2020.

See also 
 Sockburn Worm
 The Laidly Worm of Spindleston Heugh
 Worm of Linton
 English folklore
 Jabberwocky
 Mongolian death worm

References

Bibliography

External links 
 A version of the story by Philip Atkinson
 A version of the story by Herrington Heritage
 A version of the story by Claire Russell
 The Lambton Worm and Penshaw Hill (Mysterious Britain)
 Serene Dragon version
 
 The Lambton Worm – a cantata
 The History of the Lambton and Sockburn Worms, Records of Early English Drama: North East Project 

English folklore
English folk songs
Songs about fictional characters
English legendary creatures
Culture in Tyne and Wear
European dragons
City of Sunderland
Northumbrian folklore
Northumbrian folkloric beings
County Durham folklore
Music based on European myths and legends